Abdul Rashid or Abdul Rasheed may refer to:

 Abdul Rashid (agriculturist) (born 1950), Pakistani scientist and Pakistan Atomic Energy Commission member
 Abdul Rashid (judge) (1889–1981), first Chief Justice of Pakistan
 Abdul Rashid (hurdler) (born 1979), Pakistani Olympic hurdler
 Abdul Rashid (runner) (born 1928), Pakistani long-distance runner and competitor in the 1956 Olympic marathon
 Lala Abdul Rashid (1922–1988), Pakistani Olympic field hockey player
  Abdul Rashid, Pakistani Olympic field hockey player
  Abdul Rashid Jr., Pakistani Olympic field hockey player
 Abdul Rahim Rasheed (1938–2006), Indian Muslim community leader and lawyer to the New Zealand Muslim minority
 Abdul Rasjid, Dutch East Indies physician and politician

See also
 Abdul Rashid (name)